The Haus der Bayerischen Geschichte: Museum (aka Museum der Bayerischen Geschichte) is a history museum about the history of Bavaria, located in Regensburg. It is part of Haus der Bayerischen Geschichte (Munich) which is financed by the state government.

It opened on June 5th, 2019. The director is Richard Loibl.

The permanent exhibition area measures 2500 m2 and displays c. 1,000 objects in the time span from 1806 (Kingdom of Bavaria) until the present time.

The construction of the building and the interior cost c. 95 million euros.

See also
List of museums in Germany#Bavaria

References

External links

Museums in Regensburg
History of Bavaria
History museums in Germany
2019 establishments in Germany
Museums established in 2019